Daniel Percy Peebles III  (born May 30, 1966) is a former American football wide receiver in the National Football League for the Tampa Bay Buccaneers and the Cleveland Browns. Peebles attended North Carolina State. Danny's first three receptions as an NFL rookie in 89' averaged 28.3 yards. As a senior, Danny caught 23 passes for  439 yards, including a 75-yard TD catch in the Peach Bowl.

Personal
He has four children: Damiya, Danny (D.J), Dylan, and Jada. He currently resides in Raleigh. Danny's oldest daughter Damiya, is an alumna of Meredith College in Raleigh, North Carolina. 

In a game against the Houston Oilers at the Astrodome, on November 17, 1991, Peebles was involved in a helmet-to-helmet collision with Bubba McDowell. He suffered from loss of feeling and movement in his arms and legs for approximately 10 minutes after being hit during a third-quarter pass. Peebles retired from the NFL on Dec 3, 1991.

References

External links
NFL.com player page

1966 births
Living people
Players of American football from Raleigh, North Carolina
American football wide receivers
NC State Wolfpack football players
Tampa Bay Buccaneers players
Cleveland Browns players